Iruvazhanjippuzha, or Iruvanjipuzha, is a major tributary of River Chaliyar and joining to Chaliyar at Koolimadu near Cheruvadi. Its major tributary is Chalippuzha, which joins with it about 3 km north of Thiruvambady town. Other tributaries are Muthappanpuzha (joining at Anakkampoyil), ulingappuzha (joining at Thiruvambadi) and Karamoola river (join at Mukkam). The famous Thusharagiri waterfall is in the Chalippuzha river. Every year the Malabar River Festival happens in this river, which is recognized as the biggest Kayak event in Asia.

The villages of Anakkampoyil, Thiruvambady, Mukkam, Kodiyathur, Chennamangallur and Cheruvadi are on the banks of this river.

Naadan Premam, a major romantic novel written by legendary writer S. K. Pottekkatt, is set in the backdrops of Iruvanjippuzha.  The river is also mentioned in the film Ennu Ninte Moideen. In this film it shows how the real character dies B. P. Moideen after drowning in the Iruvanjippuzha River.

References

Rivers of Kozhikode district
Thamarassery area